The 1993–94 Midland Football Combination season was the 57th in the history of Midland Football Combination, a football competition in England.

At the end of the season Midland Football Alliance were to be created. Ten Premier Division clubs joined newly formed league along with West Midlands (Regional) League clubs. Thus, the league became Midland Alliance feeder and downgraded to ninth level of the overall English football league system.

Premier Division

The Premier Division featured 17 clubs which competed in the division last season, along with five new clubs:
Ansells, promoted from Division Two
Kings Heath, promoted from Division One
Shepshed Albion, relegated from the Northern Premier League
Shifnal Town
Wellesbourne, promoted from Division One

League table

References

1993–94
8